Ádám Nagy (born 17 June 1995) is a Hungarian professional footballer who plays as a midfielder for  club Pisa and the Hungary national team.

He began his career at Ferencváros, making his professional debut for the reserves in August 2013 and for the first team in May 2015. Nagy won eight caps and scored one goal for Hungary at youth level. He made his full international debut against Northern Ireland on 7 September 2015 coming on as a substitute, and was chosen for UEFA Euro 2016.

Career

Early years
Nagy was born in Budapest, Hungary. After starting his career at Goldball '94 FC, he played for Tabáni Spartacus SKE and Szent István SE. In 2008, he had a brief spell at the futsal club Aramis Sport Egyesület.

At the age of 16, he went to La Manga Club to join the football academy created by English football development academy VisionPro Sports Institute. In January 2012, the academy moved to Portugal forming the VSI Rio Maior Football Club, and established themselves in the lower levels of the Santarém Football Association Juniors Championship. The project was led by former Premier League players such as Ian Wright and Mark Hughes. The academy was coached by English coach Paul Simpson and the team was composed of young players, between the ages of 16 and 19, from Portugal, Hungary, Angola, Wales, England, Congo and Spain. The project ended in March 2013, due to mis-management of funds by the VSI Chairman and directors.

Ferencváros
On 13 August 2013, Nagy signed with Ferencváros. He made his professional debut in the 2013–14 campaign, with the II-team in the third division. He made his first appearance in the competition on 24 August 2013, playing in the 0–2 home loss against Felsőtárkány. On 30 August 2015 he scored his first goal in their 7–0 win at Ebes.

On 12 May 2015, Nagy made his debut for made his official debut for Ferencváros, playing in a 3–0 home win against Honvéd for the season's League Cup. Four days later, he played his first match in the Nemzeti Bajnokság against Paksi FC. The match ended with a 1–0 victory for the Budapest team. Nagy entered the pitch in the 46th minute as a substitute for Ugrai. On 20 May 2015, Nagy helped his team win the 2015 Magyar Kupa Final by playing 70 minutes in the final.

On 2 April 2016, Nagy became Hungarian League champion with Ferencváros after losing to Debrecen 2–1 at the Nagyerdei Stadion in the 2015–16 Nemzeti Bajnokság I season.

On 10 June 2016, Nagy was listed among the top 10 young talents at the Euro 2016. The list was created by Sports Illustrated and includes football players such as Kingsley Coman, Julian Draxler, and Raphaël Guerreiro.

During the European Championship, Nagy attracted attention from clubs such as Benfica, Olympique de Marseille and Leicester City.

Bologna
On 14 July 2016, Nagy joined Italian side Bologna after an impressive performance with the national team at the UEFA Euro 2016. In December 2016 he was voted Bologna's Player of the Month for December. In a friendly before the 2017–18 Serie A season, Nagy scored the 8th goal for Bologna.

In April of the 2017–18 Serie A season, he was voted as the third best player, preceded by Simone Verdi and Andrea Poli in the team by the voters of the official website of Bologna FC. However, the 2017-18 season was not as successful as the previous season for Nagy since he made only 12 appearances throughout the season. On 15 April 2018, he scored his first Serie A goal for Bologna against Hellas Verona F.C. in 94th minute at the Stadio Renato Dall'Ara, Bologna.

In the 2018–19 Serie A season Nagy made only 14 appearances among which 10 times he was in the starting line-up during the coaching of Filippo Inzaghi and Siniša Mihajlović, and during the summer of 2019 he repeatedly iterated that he would like to leave Bologna.

Bristol City 
On 8 August 2019, Nagy joined English Championship side Bristol City on a three-year deal with the option for a fourth year. On 10 August 2019, he debuted in the 2019–20 EFL Championship against Birmingham City F.C. at St Andrew's and scored his first goal against QPR in the next game.

Pisa
On 27 August 2021, Nagy signed a four-year contract with Serie B club Pisa...

International career
Nagy was part of the Hungary U-20 team at the 2015 FIFA U-20 World Cup, playing in four games (three starts) in an eventual Round of 16 exit.

On 7 September 2015, Nagy played his first match in the Hungary national team in a 1–1 draw against Northern Ireland in a UEFA Euro 2016 qualifying Group F match at Windsor Park. He entered the pitch in the 23rd minute as a substitute for Elek.

Nagy was selected for Hungary's Euro 2016 squad.

On 14 June 2016, Nagy played in the first group match in a 2–0 victory over Austria at the UEFA Euro 2016 Group F match at Nouveau Stade de Bordeaux, Bordeaux, France. Three days later on 18 June 2016 he played in a 1–1 draw against Iceland at the Stade Vélodrome, Marseille.

On 18 November 2018, he scored his first goal for the national team against Finland at the Groupama Aréna, Budapest, in a 2018–19 UEFA Nations League C match.

On 1 June 2021, Nagy was included in the final 26-man squad to represent Hungary at the rescheduled UEFA Euro 2020 tournament.

Career statistics

Club

International
.

Scores and results list Hungary's goal tally first, score column indicates score after each Nagy goal.

Honours
Ferencváros
Nemzeti Bajnokság I: 2015–16
Hungarian Cup: 2014–15, 2015–16
Hungarian League Cup: 2014–15
Szuperkupa: 2015

Individual
Nemzeti Sport Team of the Season: 2015–16

References

External links
Ferencváros profile 
HLSZ statistics 
MLS database 

1995 births
Living people
Footballers from Budapest
Association football midfielders
Hungarian footballers
Hungary youth international footballers
Hungary under-21 international footballers
Hungary international footballers
Ferencvárosi TC footballers
Bologna F.C. 1909 players
Bristol City F.C. players
Pisa S.C. players
Nemzeti Bajnokság I players
Nemzeti Bajnokság III players
Serie A players
Serie B players
English Football League players
UEFA Euro 2016 players
UEFA Euro 2020 players
Hungarian expatriate footballers
Hungarian expatriate sportspeople in Italy
Expatriate footballers in Italy
Hungarian expatriate sportspeople in England
Expatriate footballers in England